Michael Alex Crabtree Jr. (born September 14, 1987) is a former American football wide receiver who played in the National Football League (NFL) for 11 seasons. He played college football at Texas Tech, where he was a two-time unanimous All-American, and was selected 10th overall by the San Francisco 49ers in the 2009 NFL Draft. Crabtree was a member of the 49ers for six seasons and spent the remainder of his career with the Oakland Raiders, Baltimore Ravens, and Arizona Cardinals.

Early years
Crabtree was born in Dallas, Texas. He attended David W. Carter High School in Dallas, where he played basketball and football and ran track for the Cowboys program. He played as a quarterback for the Carter Cowboys high school football team. As a senior, he passed for 870 yards and eleven touchdowns on 45 completions out of 100 attempts. He also ran for 646 yards and nine touchdowns on 100 carries. He was a four-star football recruit as an athlete.

Crabtree ranked among the top 51 recruits in the state of Texas going into college. During a visit in 2004, Texas Tech basketball coach Bob Knight asked Crabtree which sport he was going to choose. Though the decision was not an easy one, he opted to play college football exclusively.

Recruiting
Crabtree was offered football scholarships by Baylor, Illinois, Iowa, Kansas State, Oklahoma, Texas A&M, Texas Tech, and Kansas. He was also recruited by Texas, whose coaches wanted him to play defense. Crabtree refused, stating that he wanted to score touchdowns.

College career
Crabtree accepted an athletic scholarship to attend Texas Tech University, where he played for coach Mike Leach and the Texas Tech Red Raiders football team from 2006 to 2008.

Freshman season
Crabtree was redshirted his freshman season of 2006 because of a transcript glitch and a position change from quarterback to wide receiver.

In 2007, Crabtree started his redshirt-freshman season against SMU. The Red Raiders won 49–9, and Crabtree stood out with 106 yards receiving on twelve receptions for three touchdowns. The next week, in a 45–31 win over UTEP, Crabtree continued his performance with 15 receptions, 188 yards, and two touchdowns. Against the Rice Owls, Crabtree put up 244 yards on eleven receptions for three touchdowns. In Tech's first loss of the season, against Oklahoma State, he had 14 receptions for 237 yards and three touchdowns. In a 75–7 win over Northwestern State, Crabtree had 145 yards on eight receptions for three touchdowns in only two and a half quarters of playing time. In the contest against Iowa State, Crabtree had 10 receptions for 154 yards and three touchdowns.

During the Iowa State game, Crabtree broke the season record for most touchdown receptions by a freshman receiver. The previous record of 14 was shared by Jabar Gaffney in 2000, Mike Williams in 2002, and Davone Bess in 2005. In the October 13, 2007, game, Crabtree tacked on 170 more receiving yards on eight receptions but had no touchdowns in a 35–7 win over the Texas A&M Aggies. This brought his total yardage to 1,244. In the next game, against Missouri, he again did not score but still added 76 more yards on ten catches. In spite of having two consecutive games without a touchdown, CBS Sports still ranked Crabtree as the top freshman in the nation.

During the game against Colorado, Crabtree made his 99th catch. This set three records simultaneously—most single-season receptions by a freshman in I-A, most single-season receptions by a Red Raider, and most single-season touchdowns by a Big 12 player (18). Crabtree finished his freshman season with 134 receptions, 1,962 yards, and 22 touchdowns.

Sophomore season

Before the beginning of his sophomore season, CBS Sports listed Crabtree as a Heisman hopeful. Tech quarterback Graham Harrell's name also appeared on the list. Crabtree, along with Harrell and head coach Mike Leach, were featured on the cover of the 2008 edition of Dave Campbell's Texas Football. His name has also appeared on the Maxwell Award preseason watchlist along with Harrell. To support the Heisman campaign of both Harrell and Crabtree, Texas Tech created a website called PassOrCatch2008.com, which is modelled after political campaigns. The site has garnered national attention and was awarded a Telly Award which honors the best in local, regional, and cable commercials and programs, as well as online videos, films, and commercials. Crabtree finished fifth in the Heisman race behind Harrell at fourth.

Crabtree began his sophomore campaign in the 49–24 win over Eastern Washington, recording 9 receptions for 73 yards and a touchdown in limited playing time. In the following 35–19 win over Nevada, he totaled 7 receptions for 158 yards and an 82-yard touchdown catch. Crabtree was selected as the AT&T ESPN All-America Player of the Week for following 43–7 win over Southern Methodist for totaling a season-high 164 yards and 3 touchdowns from 8 receptions.

In the 56–14 win over Massachusetts, Crabtree recorded 62 yards and a touchdown off of 5 receptions in limited playing time. In the following 58–28 win over Kansas State, he totaled 107 yards on 9 receptions for 2 touchdowns. The Red Raiders then defeated Nebraska 37–31, in which he had 5 receptions for 89 yards and two touchdowns. In the following 43–25 win over Texas A&M, he totaled 71 yards and two touchdowns from 8 receptions. He also compiled his first kickoff return of his career in the game, running the ball for 50 yards. On the return however, he tweaked his left ankle and hobbled off the field.

Crabtree partially recovered from his ankle sprain enough to play at Kansas, where he amassed 70 yards and two touchdowns off of 9 receptions in a 63–21 Tech victory. The Red Raiders then upset #1 Texas 39–33. Down 33–32, Tech drove down into the Longhorns' territory with 8 seconds left in the game. Quarterback Graham Harrell threw to Crabtree in double coverage inside the 10-yard line. Crabtree grabbed the pass, shook a defender on the sideline, and ran into the endzone for the game-winning touchdown with a second left in the game. As the Red Raiders won, Crabtree finished with 127 yards and a touchdown off of 10 receptions. In Oklahoma State game, Crabtree recorded 89 yards and three touchdowns on eight catches. He extended his streak of at least five receptions and a touchdown catch to 13 games, placing him in a tie for second-longest all time. In these three games, he hobbled off the field at times after making catches. He used the bye week before the Oklahoma game to fully recover from the injury.
On December 2, 2008, Crabtree and teammate Graham Harrell were named as Walter Camp Award finalists.
Crabtree started the year with the expectation that he would compete for the Heisman trophy, and in the end he finished fifth in the Heisman voting, garnering 3 first place votes.

On April 23, 2009, EA Sports announced that Crabtree would be featured on the cover of NCAA Football 10 for Xbox 360. Cover athletes for the other editions of the game are Brian Johnson of the Utah Utes (PlayStation 3), Brian Orakpo of the Texas Longhorns (PlayStation 2), and Mark Sanchez of the USC Trojans (PlayStation Portable). The game was available in stores beginning July 14, 2009.

NCAA records
After only two seasons at Texas Tech, Crabtree was able to achieve eight NCAA records. See also NCAA records held by individual Red Raiders

The NCAA Record book also mentions Michael Crabtree for the following items:
 Season Receptions: 134 (Rank 8th) 2007
 Season Receptions per game: 10.31 (Rank 10th) 2007
 Season Yards: 1,962 (Rank 3rd) 2007
 Season Yards Per Game: 150.9 (Rank 5th) 2007
 Season Touchdown Receptions: 22 (Rank 7th) 2007
 Season Touchdown Receptions: 19 (Rank 15th) 2008
 Career Receptions Per Game: 8.89 (Rank 5th)
 Career Yards Per Game: 120.3 (Rank 5th)
 Career Touchdown Receptions: 41 (Rank 10th)
 Annual Champion Receptions per Game: 2007
 Annual Champion Receiving Yards Per Game: 2007
 Career Points Per Game: 9.46 (Rank 19th)

NCAA Records Reference (Last referenced for 2015 season)

Recognition
Crabtree has received multiple honors due to his accomplishments at Texas Tech. In addition to being a two-time unanimous first-team All-American, he is a two-time Biletnikoff Award and Paul Warfield Award winner. He is one of only five Red Raiders in school history have earned unanimous All-American honors. The other four to receive the honor are: Mark Bounds in 1991, Zach Thomas in 1995, Byron Hanspard in 1996, and Jace Amaro in 2013.

College statistics

Professional career

Pre-draft

Shortly before the deadline, Crabtree declared himself eligible for the 2009 NFL Draft, after discussions with his coach Mike Leach, and with representatives of the NFL who advised that "he would be a first-round pick". At the press conference to announce his plans to enter the NFL Draft, Crabtree was accompanied by his Texas Tech Red Raider teammate Brandon Williams, who made a similar announcement. Williams had led the Big 12 Conference in sacks. The San Francisco 49ers drafted Crabtree as the tenth overall pick in the 2009 NFL Draft. NFL Draft analyst Mel Kiper Jr. had projected Crabtree to be selected by the Seattle Seahawks as the fourth overall pick.

On February 21, 2009, it was reported that Crabtree sustained a severe Jones fracture in his left foot, which would require surgery to insert a screw and would leave him unable to perform for the next six to ten weeks including the NFL Combine and Texas Tech's pro day. Doctors found that the injury had happened recently, and possibly during his training for the combine. However, Crabtree stated that the stress fracture had been there for a year and did not cause him pain. On March 1, Crabtree stated he would have surgery and forgo the workout at Texas Tech's pro day on March 26.

At the 2009 NFL Combine, Crabtree weighed 214 pounds; his height was reported at 6 ft 1 ⅜ in. He later scored 15 on the Wonderlic Test.

San Francisco 49ers
Crabtree was selected in the first round with the 10th overall pick by the San Francisco 49ers in the 2009 NFL Draft. He was the highest drafted Texas Tech Red Raider since halfback Donny Anderson went seventh overall in the 1965 NFL Draft. On July 28, 2009, Crabtree failed to report for training camp because he had no contract.  Crabtree's training camp no show was the first for a rookie since 2005.  Sources close to Crabtree indicated that he was prepared to sit out the 2009–2010 NFL season and re-enter the 2010 NFL Draft. Crabtree's agent Eugene Parker stated that he denied threatening the 49ers with having Crabtree sit out the season and reenter the draft. On August 30, 2009, Crabtree became the last holdout and unsigned draft pick from the 2009 NFL draft when Andre Smith, the 6th overall pick, signed with the Bengals. That day was also the 32nd day of Crabtree's holdout, and only 10 days short of the all-time long holdout for any 49ers rookie in the franchise's history. Beat reporter Matt Maiocco had reported rumors that the signing could have happened around Labor Day, but that did not occur as the sides remained at a complete impasse. Over Labor Day weekend Deion Sanders, an NFL reporter and Crabtree counselor, stated on the NFL Total Access show that Crabtree was indeed willing to sit out the entire season. Sanders also claimed that the rookie receiver was not in "dire need" of money at that time. By September 9, 2009, Crabtree set a 49ers record by becoming the longest rookie holdout in franchise history. The last first-round draft pick to hold out for an entire season was quarterback Kelly Stouffer in 1987 when he refused to sign with the Cardinals. Stouffer was eventually traded in April 1988 to the Seahawks for three draft picks, including a first pick in the 1989 draft. The 49ers would have had the option to trade the rights to Crabtree only after March 1, 2010, and up until the next draft. If a team were to trade for the rights, that team would not be able to sign such a player before the 2010 NFL Draft. If he was not signed by the 49ers and then traded to another team, his contract would have then counted against that team's 2010 rookie pool.

2009 season

On September 21, 2009, the 49ers filed charges against the New York Jets for attempting to tamper with their negotiations with Crabtree. The 49ers may have believed the Jets contacted Crabtree's agent to let him know they'd be interested in trading for his rights, or in drafting him in 2010 with a better salary than the 49ers were offering. The 49ers had until November 17 to sign Crabtree or he wouldn't have been allowed to play in the 2009 season along with its being considered a non-accrued season for contract purposes.

On October 7, 2009, ESPN reported that Crabtree and the 49ers had agreed to a six-year contract. ESPN's Adam Schefter reported the deal would be worth $32 million, with $17 million guaranteed, $8 million more than offered by the team in August 2009, but also a year longer. The contract can void to five years based on Pro Bowl and playing time triggers.

On October 25, 2009, Crabtree made his first career NFL start against the Houston Texans catching five passes for 56 yards and playing more snaps than any other 49ers receiver in the game. On November 22, 2009, Crabtree caught his first touchdown on a 38-yard pass from quarterback Alex Smith, beating veteran All-Pro cornerback Al Harris on the play. He caught his second touchdown pass, and his first touchdown at Candlestick Park, against the Arizona Cardinals in a Week 14 divisional match-up. He led all rookie receivers in yards per game, with 56.8.

2010 season

In the season opener against the Seattle Seahawks, Crabtree caught 2 passes for 12 yards (a career low). It was the first time in his career that he did not record at least 3 receptions in a game. In the home opener on Monday Night Football against the New Orleans Saints he caught 1 pass (career low) for 32 yards. On October 10, 2010, Crabtree recorded his first career 100+-yard game. He caught 9 passes for 105 yards and also had a 7-yard touchdown. He caught the go-ahead 32-yard touchdown against Oakland in week 6. It was the first time he caught a touchdown in consecutive games. In Week 16, against the St. Louis Rams, he recorded a career-high 60-yard touchdown reception in the second quarter of the 25–17 loss. Overall, in the 2010 season, he finished with 55 receptions for 741 receiving yards and six receiving touchdowns.

2011 season

Crabtree suffered a broken foot during player-only off-season workouts in 2011. He received surgery and missed the entire preseason. In the first game of the regular season against the Seahawks, he was still not fully recovered from his injury and sat out the second half of that game and the next game against the Dallas Cowboys. Crabtree caught his first touchdown of the season in a 20–10 win against the Cleveland Browns. His second touchdown reception occurred in a home game against the St. Louis Rams on a 52-yard pass from Alex Smith. In the final game of the regular season in St. Louis, Crabtree recorded the first multi-touchdown game of his NFL career with two touchdown receptions, one of which came from kicker David Akers on a fake field goal. Crabtree finished the season with a career-high in both receptions (72) and receiving yards (874). In the playoffs, Crabtree caught a five-yard touchdown pass in the Divisional Round against the New Orleans Saints to give the 49ers an early 14–0 lead. However, in the Saints game and NFC Championship against the New York Giants, he totaled only five receptions for 28 yards.

2012 season

In 2012, Crabtree posted his first season with greater than 1,000 receiving yards as he continued to develop as a player and grow into his role as the number-one target in the 49ers' passing game. Following Colin Kaepernick's ascension to the starting quarterback position, Crabtree became a greater focal point of the offense, as Kaepernick's ability enabled more down-field passing. Crabtree began to put up better numbers with Kaepernick at the helm. Late in the season, Crabtree showed dominance with 107 yards and two touchdowns against the New England Patriots and a career-high 172 yards and two touchdowns against the Arizona Cardinals. Crabtree finished with career highs in targets, receptions, yards and touchdowns. In the post-season, Crabtree had nine catches for 119 yards and two touchdowns in a 49ers victory over the Green Bay Packers in the Divisional Round, as well as six receptions for 57 yards in the NFC Championship win over the Atlanta Falcons. Crabtree had five receptions for 109 yards including a touchdown in the Super Bowl XLVII loss to the Baltimore Ravens by a score of 34–31.

2013 season

On May 22, 2013, Crabtree underwent surgery to repair a torn Achilles tendon. The surgery required a minimum of six months to recover. On August 27, 2013, the 49ers placed Crabtree on the reserve/physically unable to perform list. He was most likely to return to the field in mid-November 2013. On November 25, 2013, rumors circulated online that he would be activated since November 26 would be the deadline for the team to activate him or face benching him for the rest of the season. On November 26, 2013, the 49ers activated him and waived a backup quarterback to make room for him on the 53-man roster. Crabtree played his first game of the 2013 season on December 1, 2013, in Week 13 against the St. Louis Rams making two receptions for 68 yards and the 49ers won the game 23–13. Crabtree caught his first and only touchdown of the season against the Tampa Bay Buccaneers. In the Wild Card Round of the playoffs, Crabtree had eight receptions for 125 yards in the 23–20 victory over Green Bay. On January 19, 2014, an under-thrown pass to Crabtree from Kaepernick (into double coverage) in the final seconds of the NFC Championship against the Seahawks was tipped by Richard Sherman and intercepted by Malcolm Smith as the 49ers lost, 23–17.

2014 season
In Week 3 of the 2014 season, in a 23–14 loss to the Arizona Cardinals, Crabtree recorded a career-high ten receptions, which went for 80 yards and a touchdown.

Crabtree finished his 49ers career with 347 catches for 4,327 yards and 26 receiving touchdowns.

Oakland Raiders
On April 13, 2015, after becoming a free agent, Crabtree signed a one-year, $3.2 million contract with the Oakland Raiders. The contract also included $1.8 million in incentives.

2015 season
Crabtree began the 2015 season making 5 receptions for 46 yards in the season opener against the Cincinnati Bengals. In his second game as a Raider, Crabtree caught nine receptions for 111 yards and a touchdown. In a Week 9 matchup against the Pittsburgh Steelers, Crabtree caught seven receptions for 108 yards and two touchdowns. On December 9, 2015, Crabtree agreed to a 4-year, $35 million extension. Crabtree finished the 2015 season with 85 receptions for 922 receiving yards and nine receiving touchdowns.

2016 season
In the 2016 season, Crabtree had his second career 1,000-yard season and his first since 2012. In the season opener against the New Orleans Saints, he scored the Raiders' go-ahead two-point conversion on a pass from Derek Carr late in the fourth quarter of the 35–34 victory. In Week 4, against the Baltimore Ravens, Crabtree had seven receptions for 88 yards and a career-high three receiving touchdowns in the 28–27 victory. Crabtree finished the 2016 season with a career-high 89 receptions for 1,003 yards and eight touchdowns. He had three games ont the season with over 100 receiving yards.

2017 season

In Week 2, against the New York Jets, Crabtree had six receptions for 80 yards and a career-high tying three touchdowns in the 45–20 victory. During Week 7 against the Kansas City Chiefs, Crabtree had three catches for 24 yards and caught the game-winning touchdown from Derek Carr as time expired. During a Week 12 21–14 victory against the Denver Broncos, Crabtree got into a fight with cornerback Aqib Talib, resulting in both players being ejected. The next day, both combatants were suspended for two games. However, the suspension was reduced to one game following a joint appeal. Crabtree finished the 2017 season with 58 receptions for 618 yards and six touchdowns.

On March 15, 2018, Crabtree was released by the Raiders after spending three seasons with the team after the team signed Jordy Nelson. Crabtree finished his Raiders career with 232 catches for 2,543 yards and 25 receiving touchdowns.

Baltimore Ravens
On March 16, 2018, Crabtree signed a three-year, $21 million contract with the Baltimore Ravens, with $11 million guaranteed.

Crabtree was part of a Ravens' receiving unit that included Willie Snead IV and John Brown. In his Ravens debut, Crabtree caught three receptions for 38 yards and a touchdown in a 47–3 victory over the Buffalo Bills. In Week 6, against the Tennessee Titans, he had six receptions for 93 yards and his second receiving touchdown of the season in the 21–0 victory. Crabtree finished the regular season with 54 receptions for 607 yards and three touchdowns. In the Wild Card Round against the Los Angeles Chargers, Crabtree had two catches for 38 yards, both for touchdowns, as the Ravens lost 23–17.

On February 25, 2019, Crabtree was released by the Ravens.

Arizona Cardinals
On August 21, 2019, Crabtree signed a one-year contract with the Arizona Cardinals. He was released on September 23, 2019.

NFL career statistics

Endorsements
In 2012, Crabtree partnered with Ubisoft, makers of the video game, The Hip Hop Dance Experience, to create a touchdown celebration dance inspired by the video game.  Each time Crabtree performed his signature dance move "The Crab Shake" on the field, Ubisoft made a charitable donation to the Boys & Girls Club of San Francisco.

Crabtree teamed up with Subway restaurants in 2009 in his first national endorsement. The deal involves a variety of endeavors including personal appearances and behind-the-scenes webisodes which debuted the week of the 2009 NFL Draft. His other contracts includes EA Sports, Jordan Brand, three trading card companies, and MogoTXT.

Personal life
Texas Tech University honored Crabtree by incorporating a large mural of Crabtree as part of a $51.1 million expansion to the Jones AT&T Stadium.  The mural is located on the east side of the stadium inside the concession area.  Crabtree's image is also displayed prominently in the football training facility.

On September 18, 2021, Crabtree was inducted into the Texas Tech Football Ring of Honor.

See also
 List of NCAA major college football yearly receiving leaders
 List of NCAA Division I FBS career receiving touchdowns leaders

References

External links

Official website 
Texas Tech Red Raiders bio

1987 births
Living people
African-American players of American football
Players of American football from Dallas
American football wide receivers
Texas Tech Red Raiders football players
All-American college football players
San Francisco 49ers players
Oakland Raiders players
Baltimore Ravens players
Arizona Cardinals players
21st-century African-American sportspeople
20th-century African-American people